The men's triple jump event at the 2003 All-Africa Games was held on October 11.

Results

References

Triple
2003